Eldeniya is a village located in Kadawatha, Gampaha District, Sri Lanka.

References

Populated places in Gampaha District